Pompeo D'Ambrosio (1 January 1917, in San Marco Evangelista (near Salerno), Italy – 15 April 1998, in Caracas, Venezuela).

He was very renowned in the Italian community in Caracas and was very active - with his financial activity in one of the main Venezuelan banks ("Banco Latino") - for the promotion of many successful Italian entrepreneurs in Venezuela.

He was even a financial manager for Deportivo Italia, the soccer club of the Italian community in Venezuela, during its "golden" years (in the sixties and seventies), when was named by the International Federation of Football History & Statistics as "the best football team of Venezuela in the XX century". Those years, when he ruled the team with his brother Mino, are remembered as the D'Ambrosio Era.

Life

Pompeo D'Ambrosio lived his first years in Campagna, a little town in the Province of Salerno, where his uncle was the Municipal Major who distinguished himself helping the Jews during the Nazi persecution of Jews.

In the mid 1930s, Pompeo D'Ambrosio studied "Administration of Italian Colonies" at the University of Naples.

In the late 1930s he was a pilot of the Italian Air Force, but an accident forced him to be discharged from aerial service and so he became a lieutenant of the Italian Army in 1940:

During World War II, he was a Lieutenant in the Italian Army in North Africa (Libya and Egypt), where he was wounded and taken as a POW during the Battle of El Alamein, receiving a military Medal of Honor signed by the same Mussolini.

When he returned to Italy from an Allied Prisoner of War Camp in Egypt, in 1946 co-founded in Salerno the local section of the Movimento Sociale Italiano, a national-conservative Italian Party later named Alleanza Nazionale and in 2022 governing Italy with the name "Fratelli d'Italia".

Influence in the Italian community of Venezuela

In 1951 Pompeo D'Ambrosio moved to Venezuela, where started to work as Director of the "Banco Francés e Italiano" (called later "Banco Latino"), financing the Italian community of Caracas, Maracaibo and Puerto La Cruz.

Many companies of Italian-Venezuelans, like "Vinccler" and "Constructora Delpre" (that made the skyscrapers of the Parque Central Complex, actually the tallest of South America), received his experienced advice and financial help in order to grow at the first levels of the Venezuelan economy.

He was even co-founder of the "Casa de Italia" and the "Centro Italo-Venezolano" of Caracas, and participated in many other associations for the health and social assistance of the Italians with a low-level income. He even promoted the diffusion of the Italian language in Venezuela.

Santander Laya-Garrido cites him, in his book "Los Italianos forjadores de la nacionalidad y del desarrollo económico en Venezuela" (The Italians creators of the nationality and the economic development of Venezuela), as an example of honesty and dedication to the community.

His honesty made him to fight the growing but corrupted power of Pedro Tinoco (and his group called "Twelve Apostles") when he became President of the Banco Central de Venezuela. But in the eighties, D'Ambrosio was forced to resign by Tinoco from the Banco Latino, a bank that was - soon after his resignation - involved in the biggest financial crisis of Venezuela.

When the Banco Latino went bankrupt in 1994, Pompeo D'Ambrosio received an outstanding applause (appeared on all the Venezuelan media) from the "Association of Employees of the Latino Bank", during a conference denouncing the corruption of Tinoco and his group (Siro Febres Cordero, etc..).

Furthermore, Pompeo D'Ambrosio is mainly remembered by the Italian community of Venezuela because of his D'Ambrosio Era, when ruled with his brother Mino the Deportivo Italia (from 1958 to 1978, when soccer rose in prominence in Venezuela).

The D'Ambrosio Era of the Deportivo Italia

In 1958 Mino D'Ambrosio took control of the Deportivo Italia and with his brother Pompeo D'Ambrosio (who financially controlled the team) made the soccer team of the Italian community reach the top level in Venezuelan football.

The D'Ambrosio Era of the team lasted twenty years until 1978 and was characterized by four championships of the Primera División Venezolana and the famous "Little Maracanazo" of 1971 (when the Deportivo Italia won in the Stadium Maracanã of Rio de Janeiro the Fluminense, Champion of Brasil). The team obtained even three times the Copa de Venezuela: in 1961, 1962, and 1970 (and was Runner-up in 1976).  Furthermore, the team participated six times to the South American Copa Libertadores: in 1964, 1966, 1967, 1969, 1971, and 1972.

The sixties were the "golden" years of the Deportivo Italia, because they were Venezuelan Champions in 1961, 1963, and 1966. The fourth title for the team was earned in 1972 (and was Runner-up in 1965, 1968, 1969, 1970, 1971).

Indeed, between 1961 and 1972, every year, the Deportivo Italia of Pompeo and Mino D'Ambrosio obtained first or second place in the Venezuelan Championships (and/or a good performance in the South American Copa Libertadores).

Additionally - in those golden years of the D'Ambrosio Era - the Deportivo Italia won in international tournaments some renowned European teams (like the Milan of Italy in 1968) and was the first Venezuelan team - in all the history of the Venezuelan soccer - to reach the second round of the Copa Libertadores (in 1964).

See also
 Deportivo Italia
 Italo-Venezuelans
 Italian language in Venezuela
 D'Ambrosio Era (1958-1978)
 Little Maracanazo

References

Bibliography

 Briceño Javier. Un Sueño llamado Deportivo Petare. Universidad Catolica Andres Bello (Publicaciones y Tesis). Caracas, 2013 (Pompeo D'Ambrosio, p.33)
 Santander Laya-Garrido, Alfonso. Los Italianos forjadores de la nacionalidad y del desarrollo economico en Venezuela. Editorial Vadell. Valencia, 1978.
 Vannini, Maria. Italia y los Italianos en la historia y en la cultura de Venezuela. Oficina Central de Informacion. Caracas, 1966.
 Velásquez Ramón. J., Silva Carlos Rafael. El Ejecutivo Nacional y la Intervencion del Banco Latino. Talleres Gráficos de Joaquín Ibarra/Impresores. Caracas, 1994. 
 Zapata, Juan Carlos. Dr. Tinoco. Vida y muerte del poder en Venezuela. Colección Claroscuro. Caracas, 2006.

1917 births
1998 deaths
Italian emigrants to Venezuela
Italian military personnel of World War II
Italian soldiers
People from Caracas
20th-century Venezuelan businesspeople
Venezuelan sportspeople
People from Campagna